Troisi is a surname of Italian origin. It may refer to:

Alfonso Troisi (b. 1954), Argentine former football player
Dante Troisi (1920–1989), Italian writer and magistrate
James Troisi (b. 1988), Australian football (soccer) player
Licia Troisi (b. 1980), Italian fantasy writer
Lino Troisi (1932–1998), Italian actor
Marcello Troisi (b. 1976), Brazilian football player
Massimo Troisi (1953–1994), Italian actor, film director and poet
Pietro Paolo Troisi (1686–1743), Maltese artist
Rebecca J. Troisi, American cancer epidemiologist 

Italian-language surnames